A pedestrian is a person traveling on foot, whether walking or running. In modern times, the term usually refers to someone walking on a road or pavement, but this was not the case historically.

In California the definition of a pedestrian has been broadened to include anyone on any human powered vehicle that is not a bicycle, as well as people operating self-propelled wheelchairs by reason of physical disability. In some communities, those traveling using tiny wheels such as roller skates, skateboards, and scooters, as well as wheelchair users are also included as pedestrians.

Etymology
The meaning of pedestrian is displayed with the morphemes ped- ('foot') and -ian ('characteristic of'). This word is derived from the Latin term pedester ('going on foot') and was first used (in English language) during the 18th century. It was originally used, and can still be used today, as an adjective meaning plain or dull. However, in this article it takes on its noun form and refers to someone who walks.

The word pedestrian may have been used in middle French in the Recueil des Croniques et Anchiennes Istories de la Grant Bretaigne.

History

Walking has always been the primary means of human locomotion. The first humans to migrate from Africa, about 60,000 years ago, walked. They walked along the coast of India to reach Australia. They walked across Asia to reach the Americas, and from Central Asia into Europe.

With the advent of the cars in the beginning of the 20th century, the main story is the cars took over, and 'people chose the car', but there were many groups and movements that both held on to walking as their preferred means of daily transport and some who organised and sought to bring forth their conviction, and to counterbalance the onesided media coverage that often favoured cars, e.g as related by Peter Norton. 

During the 18th and 19th centuries, pedestrianism (walking) was a popular spectator sport just as equestrianism still is in places such as the United Kingdom and the United States. One of the most famous pedestrians of that period was Captain Robert Barclay Allardice, known as "The Celebrated Pedestrian", of Stonehaven in Scotland. His most impressive feat was to walk  every hour for 1000 hours, which he achieved between 1 June and 12 July 1809. This feat captured many people's imagination, and around 10,000 people came to watch over the course of the event. During the rest of the 19th century, many people tried to repeat this feat, including Ada Anderson who developed it further and walked a half-mile (800 m) each quarter-hour over the 1,000 hours.

Since the 20th century, interest in walking as a sport has dropped. Racewalking is still an Olympic sport, but fails to catch public attention as it did. However major walking feats are still performed, such as the Land's End to John o' Groats walk in the United Kingdom, and the traversal of North America from coast to coast. The first person to walk around the world was Dave Kunst who started his walk traveling east from Waseca, Minnesota on 20 June 1970 and completed his journey on 5 October 1974, when he re-entered the town from the west. These feats are often tied to charitable fundraising and are undertaken by celebrities such as Sir Jimmy Savile and Ian Botham as well as by others.

Footpaths and roads

Outdoor pedestrian networks

Roads often have a designated footpath for pedestrian traffic, called the sidewalk in North American English, the pavement in British English, and the footpath in Australian and New Zealand English. There are also footpaths not associated with a road; these include urban short cuts and also rural paths used mainly by ramblers, hikers, or hill-walkers. Footpaths in mountainous or forested areas may also be called trails. Pedestrians share some footpaths with horses and bicycles: these paths may be known as bridleways. Other byways used by walkers are also accessible to vehicles. There are also many roads with no footpath. Some modern towns (such as the new suburbs of Peterborough in England) are designed with the network of footpaths and cycle paths almost entirely separate from the road network.

The term trail is also used by the authorities in some countries to mean any footpath that is not attached to a road or street. If such footpaths are in urban environments and are meant for both pedestrians and pedal cyclists, they can be called shared use paths or multi-use paths in general and official usage.

Some shopping streets are for pedestrians only. Some roads have special pedestrian crossings. A bridge solely for pedestrians is a footbridge.

Under British law, regardless of whether there is a footpath, pedestrians have the right to use most public roads, excluding motorways and some toll tunnels and bridges such as the Blackwall Tunnel and the Dartford Crossing. The UK Highway Code advises that pedestrians should walk in the opposite direction to oncoming traffic on a road with no footpath.

Indoor pedestrian networks
Indoor pedestrian networks connect the different rooms or spaces of a building. Airports, museums, campuses, hospitals and shopping centres might have tools allowing for the computation of the shortest paths between two destinations. Their increasing availability is due to the complexity of path finding in these facilities. Different mapping tools, such as OpenStreetMap, are extending to indoor spaces.

Pedestrianisation
Pedestrianisation might be considered as process of removing vehicular traffic from city streets or restricting vehicular access to streets for use by pedestrians, in order to improve the environment and the safety.

Efforts are under way by pedestrian advocacy groups to restore pedestrian access to new developments, especially to counteract newer developments, 20% to 30% of which in the United States do not include footpaths. Some activists advocate large pedestrian zones where pedestrians only or pedestrians and some non-motorised vehicles are allowed. Many urbanists have extolled the virtues of pedestrian streets in urban areas. In the US the proportion of households without a car is 8%, but a notable exception is New York City, the only locality in the United States where more than half of all households do not own a car (the figure is even higher in Manhattan, over 75%).

The use of cars for short journeys is officially discouraged in many parts of the world, and construction or separation of dedicated walking routes in city centres receives a high priority in many large cities in Western Europe, often in conjunction with public transport enhancements. In Copenhagen, the world's longest pedestrian shopping area, Strøget, has been developed over the last 40 years principally due to the work of Danish architect Jan Gehl, a principle of urban design known as copenhagenisation.

Safety issues

Safety is an important issue where cars can cross the pedestrian way. Drivers and pedestrians share some responsibility for improving safety of road users. Road traffic crashes are not inevitable; they are both predictable and preventable.

Key risks for pedestrians are well known. Among the well documented factors are: driver behaviour, (including speeding, drinking and driving); infrastructure missing facilities (including pavements, crossings and islands); and vehicle design which are not forgiving to pedestrians crashed by a vehicle. Because pedestrians are not protected by their vehicle while car occupants are, pedestrians are usually classified in the vulnerable road user category, even in Canada. Most pedestrian injuries occur while they are crossing a street/road. Most crashes involving a pedestrian occur at night. Most pedestrian fatalities are killed by a frontal impact. In such a situation, an adult pedestrian is struck by a car front (for instance, the bumper touches either the leg or knee-joint area), accelerating the lower part of the body forward while "the upper body is rotated and accelerated relative to the car," at which point the pelvis and thorax are hit. Then the head hits the windscreen at the velocity of the striking car. Finally, the victim falls to the ground. 

Furthermore, research has shown that urban crimes, or the mere perception of crimes, severely affects the mental and physical health of pedestrians. Inter-pedestrian behaviour, without the involvement of vehicles, is also a key factor to pedestrian safety. 

Some special interest groups consider pedestrian fatalities on American roads a carnage.
Five states — Arizona, California, Florida, Georgia and Texas — produce 46% of all pedestrians deaths in the country.
The advent of SUVs is considered a leading cause; speculation of other factors includes population growth, driver distraction with mobile phones, poor street lighting, alcohol and drugs and speeding.

Cities have had mixed result in addressing pedestrian safety with Vizion zero plan: Los Angeles has failes while NYC has had success. Nonetheless in the US, some pedestrians have just 40 seconds to cross a 10 lanes street.

Pedestrian fatalities are much more common in accident situations in the European Union than in the United States. In the European Union countries, more than 200,000 pedestrians and cyclists are injured annually. Also, each year, more than 270 000 pedestrians lose their lives on the world's roads. At a global level pedestrians constitute 22% of all road deaths, but might be two thirds in some countries.
Pedestrian fatalities, in 2016, are 2.6 per million population in the Netherlands, 4.3 in Sweden, 4.5 per million population in Wales, 5.3 in New Zealand, 6.0 in Germany; 7.1 in United Kingdom, 7.5 in Australia, 8.4 in France, 8.4 in Spain, 9.4 in Italy, 11.1 in Israel, 13 in Japan, 13.8 in Greece, 18.5 in the United States of America, 22.9 in Poland, and 36.3 in Romania

Safety trends

Road design impact on safety

It is well documented that a minor increase in speed might greatly increase the likelihood of a crash, and exacerbate resulting casualties.
and traffic-calming measures.

The design of road and streets plays a key role in pedestrian safety. Roads are too often designed for motorized vehicles, without taking into account pedestrian and bicycle needs. The non-existence of sidewalk and signals increases risk for pedestrians. This defect might more easily be observed on arterial roadways, intersections and fast-speed lanes without adequate attention to pedestrian facilities. For instance, an assessment of roads in countries from many continents shows that 84% of roads are without pedestrian footpaths, while maximum limited speed is greater than 40 km/h.

Among the factors which reduce road safety for pedestrians are wider lanes, roadway widening, and roadways designed for higher speeds and with increased numbers of traffic lanes.

For this reason, some European cities such as Freiburg (Germany) have lowered the speed limit to 30 km/h on 90% of its streets, to reduce risk for its 15 000 people. With such policy, 24% of daily trips are performed by foot, against 28% by bicycles, 20% by public transport and 28% ( See Zone 30)

A similar set of policies to discourage the use of cars and increase safety for pedestrians has been implemented by the Northern European capitals of Oslo and Helsinki. In 2019, this resulted in both cities counting zero pedestrian deaths for the first time.

Seasonality

In Europe, pedestrian fatalities have a seasonal factor, with 6% of annual fatalities occurring in April for 13% (twice more) occurring in December. The rationale for such a change might be complex.

Pedestrian safety in the United States

Pedestrian crashes in the United States

In the US, the number of pedestrians killed increased 27 percent between 2007 and 2016. and 46% from 2010 to 2020.

In 2016 and 2017 near 6,000 pedestrians died in a motor vehicle crash. This did not occurred during the previous 25 years according to the GHSA.

Each US state is not equal on the topic of pedestrian fatalities:
 Number of pedestrian fatalities range from one in Hawaii and Wyoming to 352 in California, for the first half of 2017.
 Arizona has the highest rate of pedestrian deaths per resident population (1.61), while Hawaii has the lowest (0.07), during first semester 2017 
 New Mexico has highest pedestrian fatality rate (3.45) while Nebraska has the lowest (0.68), in 2016.
 In Michigan, crash data suggests that pedestrian fatalities (mostly at intersections) hit a ten-year high in 2021, rising from 133 in 2012 to 183 in 2021.

Possible cause of the increase of pedestrian fatalities are the decriminalization of the recreational use of marijuana (judgment and reaction time) and increased use of smartphones, source of distraction:
 Seven states (Alaska, Colorado, Maine, Massachusetts, Nevada, Oregon, Washington) which legalized marijuana have a 16.4% increase of pedestrian fatalities while other state have a decrease of 5.8%.
 Cell-phone in Emergency Department visits increase with revalence of cell phone use in the United States

State policies for pedestrians in the US

Some states developed 3E policies with enforcement, engineering improvements, and public education, based on evidence-based strategies.

Separation of Pedestrians from Motor Vehicles can be improved with pedestrian islands, pavements, pedestrian overpasses or pedestrian underpasses, countdown pedestrian signals, pedestrian hybrid beacons (or HAWK signals).

Pedestrians can be more visible to drivers with Improved street lighting, high-visibility crossings, flashing beacons.

Engineering and enforcement measures to reduce speeds with increased space for modes other than motor vehicles, roundabouts, traffic calming devices including speed bumps or kerb extension, automated traffic enforcement.

Montana yearly reviews fatalities on high-risk roads and constructs infrastructure improvements (midblock crossing improvements; signal coordination and timing improvements; improved lighting; and improved signing). Il also requires pedestrian issues are considered during a construction project. Montana pedestrian fatalities decrease by 37% between first semesters 2016 end 2017.

Vermont has a Vermont Governor’s Highway Safety Program since 2015. Vermont pedestrian fatalities decreased by 60% between first semesters 2016 and 2017.

Connecticut DOT is also involved in statewide policy. Connecticut pedestrian fatalities decreased by 35% between first semesters 2016 and 2017.

In California, the California Department of Transportation provides new roundabouts while the Office of Traffic Safety is funds Pedestrian Assessments in cities where many pedestrian crashes occur, based on engineering, education and enforcement strategies. California pedestrian fatalities decreased by 18% between first semesters 2016 and 2017.

In Texas, the DOT worked on pedestrian issues on I-35 in the Austin area and distributed reflective bags to at-risk groups (homeless population and school children).
Education is also provided for bicycle, pedestrian, children and alcohol.
Texas also relies on engineering with marked pedestrian crossings, pedestrian signals, new pavements, pedestrian islands, and kerb extensions. Texas pedestrian fatalities decreased by 18% between first semesters 2016 and 2017.

In California, pedestrian-friendly tax rebates were proposed in 2022, which would provide benefits to each car-free individual in a household.

Health benefits and environment

Regular walking is important both for human health and for the natural environment. Frequent exercise such as walking tends to reduce the chance of obesity and related medical problems. In contrast, using a car for short trips tends to contribute both to obesity and via vehicle emissions to climate change: internal combustion engines are more inefficient and highly polluting during their first minutes of operation (engine cold start). General availability of public transportation encourages walking, as it will not, in most cases, take one directly to one's destination.

Unicode
In Unicode, the hexadecimal code for "pedestrian" is 1F6B6. In XML and HTML, the string &#x1F6B6; produces 🚶.

See also
 Dérive aimless walking usually through city streets
 Footpath
 Jaywalking
 Junior safety patrol
 List of U.S. cities with most pedestrian commuters
 Pedestrian zone
 Traffic calming
 Trail ethics
 Walkability
 Walking audit
 Walking

References

External links

Walking
Transport terminology